Kabbani (and its variant Qabbani) is a surname of Arabic origin. People with the surname include:

Kabbani 
 Ali Kabbani (born 1999), known as Myth (gamer), American YouTube personality
Hisham Kabbani (born 1945), Lebanese-American Sufi scholar 
Rana Kabbani (born 1958), Syrian-British cultural historian and writer

Qabbani 
Ghalia Qabbani, Syrian writer
Nizar Qabbani (1923–1998), Syrian diplomat and poet
Sabah Qabbani (1928–2015), Syrian diplomat

Surnames of Arabic origin